Tussock grasses or bunch grasses are a group of grass species in the family Poaceae.  They usually grow as singular plants in clumps, tufts, hummocks, or bunches, rather than forming a sod or lawn, in meadows, grasslands, and prairies. As perennial plants, most species live more than one season.  Tussock grasses are often found as forage in pastures and ornamental grasses in gardens.

Many species have long roots that may reach  or more into the soil, which can aid slope stabilization, erosion control, and soil porosity for precipitation absorption. Also, their roots can reach moisture more deeply than other grasses and annual plants during seasonal or climatic droughts. The plants provide habitat and food for insects (including Lepidoptera), birds, small animals and larger herbivores, and support beneficial soil mycorrhiza. The leaves supply material, such as for basket weaving, for indigenous peoples and contemporary artists.

Tussock and bunch grasses occur in almost any habitat where other grasses are found, including: grasslands, savannas and prairies, wetlands and estuaries, riparian zones, shrublands and scrublands, woodlands and forests, montane and alpine zones, tundra and dunes, and deserts.

Fire resistance
In western North American wildfires, bunch grasses tend to smolder and not ignite into flames, unlike invasive species of annual grasses that contribute to a fire's spreading.

Genera
Examples:
Brachypodium
Calamagrostis
Chionochloa
Deschampsia
Festuca
Heteropogon (tropical climates)
Leymus
Melica
Muhlenbergia
Nassella
Stipa
Triodia, formerly Plectrachne (Australia)

Species

Australia

Gymnoschoenus sphaerocephalus – button grass
Joycea pallida – red anther wallaby grass
Poa labillardierei – common tussock-grass
Poa sieberiana – grey tussock-grass

New Zealand

Chionochloa australis – carpet grass
Chionochloa flavescens – snow tussock
Chionochloa oreophila – snow-patch grass
Chionochloa rubra – red tussock
Festuca novaezelandiae – fescue tussock or hard tussock
Poa cita – silver tussock
Poa colensoi – blue tussock
Poa foliosa – muttonbird poa

North America
Bunch grasses:
 Aristida purpurea – purple three-awn
 Bouteloua gracilis – blue grama
 Calamagrostis foliosa – leafy reedgrass (endemic to California)
 Calamagrostis nutkaensis – Pacific reedgrass
 Calamagrostis purpurascens – purple reedgrass
 Danthonia californica – California oatgrass
 Eriophorum vaginatum – hare's-tail cottongrass	
 Festuca californica – California fescue
 Festuca idahoensis – Idaho fescue
 Festuca rubra – red fescue
 Koeleria macrantha – junegrass
 Leymus condensatus – giant wildrye
 Melica californica – California melic
 Melica imperfecta – smallflower melic
 Muhlenbergia rigens – deer grass
 Nassella lepida – foothill needlegrass
 Nassella pulchra – purple needlegrass (the state grass of California)
 Poa secunda – pine bluegrass
 Sporobolus heterolepis – prairie dropseed
 Sporobolus virginicus – salt couch grass
 Tripsacum dactyloides – eastern gamagrass

South America
Deschampsia cespitosa – tufted hair-grass (up through North America)
Nassella trichotoma – serrated tussock (common pasture weed in Australia)
Poa flabellata – tussac grass (synonyms: Parodiochloa flabellata, Festuca flabellata, Dactylis caespitosa)

Africa
Heteropogon contortus – perennial tussock grass (to Asia, Australasia, Oceania)

Europe
Ampelodesmos mauritanicus – rope grass
Brachypodium sylvaticum – false-brome
Molinia caerulea – purple moor grass (to west Asia and north Africa)

See also
List of Poaceae genera
Tussock grassland

Non-Poaceae tussocks
Carex appropinquata – fibrous tussock-sedge
Carex stricta – tussock sedge
Gahnia aspera – rough saw-sedge

References

External links
California Native Grasslands Association: Bunchgrass species & habitats: preservation & restoration
 http://www.landcareresearch.co.nz/resources/identification/plants/grass-key

Grasses
Biogeography
Poaceae
Grasslands